The Conqueror is a 1956 American epic historical drama film directed by Dick Powell and written by Oscar Millard. The film stars John Wayne as the Mongol conqueror Genghis Khan and co-stars Susan Hayward, Agnes Moorehead, and Pedro Armendáriz. Produced by entrepreneur Howard Hughes, the film was principally shot near St. George, Utah.

Despite the stature of the cast and a respectable box office performance, the film was a critical flop; it is often ranked as one of the worst films of the 1950s and also as one of the worst films ever made. Wayne, who was at the height of his career, had lobbied for the role after reading the script and was widely believed to have been grossly miscast. The Conqueror was listed in the 1978 book The Fifty Worst Films of All Time. Wayne was posthumously named a "winner" of a Golden Turkey Award (awarded to movies and performances considered the worst in history) in 1980, in the "Worst Casting" category, for his performance as Genghis Khan in the film. In the years since its release, the film additionally garnered controversy for its filming downwind of a nuclear testing site, which sparked debate among historians and biologists over whether or not it caused multiple cases of cancer among the cast and crew.

Plot
Mongol chief Temujin (later to be known as Genghis Khan) falls for Bortai, the daughter of the Tatars' leader, and steals her away, precipitating war. Bortai spurns Temujin and is taken back in a raid. Temujin is later captured. Bortai falls in love with him and helps him escape. Temujin suspects he was betrayed by a fellow Mongol and sets out to find the traitor and overcome the Tatars.

Cast

 John Wayne as Temujin, later Genghis Khan
 Susan Hayward as Bortai
 Agnes Moorehead as Hunlun
 Pedro Armendáriz as Jamuga
 Thomas Gomez as Wang Khan
 John Hoyt as Shaman
 William Conrad as Kasar
 Ted de Corsia as Kumlek
 Leslie Bradley as Targutai
 Lee Van Cleef as Chepei
 Peter Mamakos as Bogurchi
 Leo Gordon as Tatar Captain
 Richard Loo as Captain of Wang's guard
 Michael Wayne (uncredited) as Mongol guard 
 Patrick Wayne (uncredited)

The role of Genghis Khan was originally written for Marlon Brando, but then Brando later backed out from the role.

Production
300 members of the Shivwits Band of Paiutes were cast as Tartar horsemen. The film had a troubled production and Oscar Millard stated that "The company had just missed being wiped out by a flash flood, and Duke Wayne had been drunk for three days. Not that it made much difference; except when a bender bloated him, it was hard to tell. His performance drunk or sober was the way other actors tend to perform if drunk."

Nuclear incident and cancer controversy

Of the 220 film crew members, 91 (comprising 41% of the crew) developed cancer during their lifetime, while 46 (or 21%) died from it. When this was learned, many suspected that filming in Utah and surrounding locations, near nuclear test sites, was to blame. Although the number of cancer cases among the cast and crew is in line with the average for adults in the US at the time, the perception of a link between the film's location and subsequent illness remains, not least because many of those involved in the film developed cancer at a younger age than average.

Parts of the film were shot in Utah locations such as Snow Canyon, Pine Valley, Leeds, and Harrisburg. The exterior scenes were shot in the Escalante Desert near St. George, Utah, which is 137 miles (220 km) downwind of the United States government's Nevada National Security Site and received the brunt of nuclear fallout from testing active in this period. In 1953, 11 above-ground nuclear weapons tests occurred at the site as part of Operation Upshot–Knothole. The cast and crew spent many difficult weeks at the site, and producer Howard Hughes later shipped 60 tons of dirt back to Hollywood in order to match the Utah terrain and lend realism to studio re-shoots. The filmmakers knew about the nuclear tests but the federal government had assured residents that the tests posed no hazard to the public health.

Director Powell died of cancer in January 1963, seven years after the film's release. Armendáriz was diagnosed with kidney cancer in 1960 and killed himself in June 1963 after he learned his condition had become terminal. Wayne, 
Hayward and Moorehead all died of cancer in the 1970s. Hoyt died of lung cancer in 1991. Van Cleef's secondary cause of death was listed as throat cancer. Some point to other factors such as the wide use of tobacco – Wayne, in particular, was a heavy smoker, and Wayne himself believed his stomach cancer to have been a result of his six-pack-a-day cigarette habit. Agnes Moorehead was a nonsmoker, teetotaler, and health fanatic, yet died of cancer. Her mother Mary maintained it was working on The Conqueror which ultimately killed Agnes. Several of Wayne and Hayward's relatives who visited the set also had cancer scares. Michael Wayne developed skin cancer, his brother Patrick had a benign tumor removed from his breast, and Hayward's son, Tim Barker, had a benign tumor removed from his mouth.

Reportedly, Hughes felt guilty about his decisions regarding the film's production, particularly over the decision to film at a hazardous site. He bought every print of the film for $12 million and kept it out of circulation for many years until Universal Pictures purchased the film from his estate in 1979. The Conqueror, along with Ice Station Zebra, is said to be one of the films Hughes watched endlessly during his last years.

Dr. Robert Pendleton, then a professor of biology at the University of Utah, is reported to have stated in 1980, "With these numbers, this case could qualify as an epidemic. The connection between fallout radiation and cancer in individual cases has been practically impossible to prove conclusively. But in a group this size you'd expect only 30-some cancers to develop.  With 91 cancer cases, I think the tie-in to their exposure on the set of The Conqueror would hold up in a court of law."  Several cast and crew members, as well as relatives of those who died, considered suing the government for negligence, claiming it knew more about the hazards in the area than it let on.

Since the primary cast and crew numbered about 220, and a considerable number of cancer cases would be expected, controversy exists as to whether the actual results are attributable to radiation at the nearby nuclear weapons test site. Statistically, the odds of developing cancer for men in the U.S. population are 43% and the odds of dying of cancer are 23% – very near what was found in this film crew. This statistic does not include the Native American Paiute extras in the film.

Release

The Conqueror received an A classification (Equivalent to a 'PG' rating in the US.) from the British Board of Film Censors but also required cuts to obtain the rating. The film premiered in London on February 2, 1956, before its Los Angeles premiere on February 22 and official theatrical release on March 28. The film also had premieres in Washington, D.C., Paris, Rome, and Manila. Its premiere in Berlin led to a riot as young fans from East Berlin, which was part of East Germany but was not yet separated from West Berlin by the Berlin Wall, stormed past the DDR Border Troops to see John Wayne. 

The film was the eleventh highest-grossing film at the North American box office in 1956, earning $4.5 million, but was a financial failure. The failure of The Conqueror, along with Vendetta, Underwater!, and Jet Pilot, financially ruined RKO Pictures.

Universal purchased the film rights in 1979, and the studio released the film on DVD as part of their Vault Series on June 12, 2012.

Reception
The critical reception was negative:

 A. H. Weiler of The New York Times called the film "an Oriental 'Western'" with a script that "should get a few unintentional laughs." Weiler wrote that John Wayne gave an "elementary" portrayal of Genghis while "constantly being unhorsed by such lines as, 'you are beautiful in your wrath.'"
 Variety called the film "a fanciful, colorful tale suggestive of the vivid period with a derring-do dash that pays off", adding, "The marquee value of the John Wayne-Susan Hayward teaming more than offsets any incongruity of the casting."
 Edwin Schallert of the Los Angeles Times wrote that the film had "a storming quality about it over-all. Which unfortunately make some of the love scenes seem all but laughable." He added, "Powell deserves much credit for maneuvering the fierce and sensational battle scenes, which are a big highlight when Mongols and Tartars clash."
 Harrison's Reports wrote that general audiences "should be more than satisfied" by the "thrilling battle scenes" and "strong romance", but the story "does not come through the screen with any appreciable dramatic force, and the acting is no more than acceptable."
 John McCarten of The New Yorker called the film "pure Hollywood moonshine ... You never saw so many horses fall down in your life. Still, even though their tumbling is far superior to the antics of the actors, it presently becomes tiresome."
 Time magazine wrote that Wayne "portrays the great conqueror as a sort of cross between a square-shootin' sheriff and a Mongolian idiot. The idea is good for a couple of snickers, but after that it never Waynes but it bores."
 The Monthly Film Bulletin called it "a rambling and rather ordinary Western-type spectacle ... the weakly contrived narrative is singularly lacking in dramatic tension, and it is difficult to see this Temujin, for all his high-flown cries to heaven to support his destiny, as a potential world-beater or as even an amiable bandit. He is merely John Wayne struggling with an unfortunate piece of casting and with such embarrassingly silly lines as 'I feel this Tartar woman is for me.'"
 The Philadelphia Inquirer predicted success for the film: "should be a three bell ringer among the popcorn set....the film is aptly titled and after 111 minutes of gore and intrigue, Wayne sets himself up as Genghis Khan, with Susan Hayward beside him. Screen playwright Oscar Millard and producer-director Dick Powell have done competent work."

The film is listed in Golden Raspberry Award founder John Wilson's book The Official Razzie Movie Guide as one of the 100 Most Enjoyably Bad Movies Ever Made.

Comic book adaptation
 Dell Four Color #690 (April 1956)

See also
 John Wayne filmography
 List of American films of 1956
 List of Asian historical drama films
 List of film and television accidents
 List of films considered the worst
 Whitewashing in film

References

Works cited

External links
 
 
 
 
 The Conqueror (1956) at the DBCult Film Institute
 Adams, Cecil (October 26, 1984). "Did John Wayne Die of Cancer Caused by a Radioactive Movie Set?" The Straight Dope

1950s adventure drama films
1956 films
American adventure drama films
Depictions of Genghis Khan on film
1950s English-language films
Films adapted into comics
Films directed by Dick Powell
Films produced by Howard Hughes
Films scored by Victor Young
Films set in Mongolia
Films set in the 12th century
Films shot in Utah
RKO Pictures films
CinemaScope films
1956 drama films
Film controversies
Race-related controversies in film
Casting controversies in film
1950s American films
American epic films